Discoelius is a palearctic genus of potter wasps with seven currently known species. It contains the following species:

 Discoelius albonotatus Brèthes, 1906
 Discoelius argentines Brèthes, 1905
 Discoelius assimilis Brèthes, 1903
 Discoelius auritulus Brèthes], 1903
 Discoelius cuyanus Brèthes, 1903
 Discoelius dimidiatus Ducke, 1904 
 Discoelius dufourii Lepeletier, 1841
 Discoelius emeishanensus Zhou & Li, 2013
 Discoelius esakii Yasumatsu, 1934
 Discoelius longinodus Sk. Yamane, 1997 
 Discoelius manchurianus Yasumatsu, 1934 
 Discoelius niger Zavattari, 1911
 Discoelius nigriclypeus Zhou & Li, 2013
 Discoelius nitidus Brethes, 1903
 Discoelius pictus Kostylev, 1940
 Discoelius planiventris Giordani Soika, 1971
 Discoelius turneri (Meade-Waldo, 1910)
 Discoelius wangi Sk. Yamane, 1990
 Discoelius zonalis (Panzer 1801)

References

 Yasumatsu, K. (1934) On the genus Discoelius of Eastern Asia, with a list of the species of the genus of the world (Hymenoptera, Eumenidae). Mushi 7: 3-19 + plt. 1.
 Zhou, X., B. Chen & T.-J. Li (2013) Two new species of the genus Discoelius Latreille (Hymenoptera, Vespidae, Eumeninae) from China, with a key to the Chinese species. Journal of Hymenoptera Research 32: 45–54.

Potter wasps
Taxa named by Pierre André Latreille
Hymenoptera genera